Fernán Gonzalo Mirás (born July 17, 1969) is an Argentine film and television actor and film director. He is sometimes credited as Fernando Mirás.

Career 
He debuted in theater at the play El protagonista, in 1989. In 1993 he starred in the successful film Tango feroz: la leyenda de Tanguito and then consolidated as one of the most prominent actors in Argentine cinema. Acted on ¿Dónde queda el paraíso?, Caballos salvajes, Carlos Monzón, el segundo juicio, Buenos Aires viceversa, Mar de amores, Buenos Aires me mata, La noche del coyote. On television he acted in La banda del Golden Rocket and between 1996 and 1997 it was the Romina Yan heartthrob in Chiquititas. He then starred alongside Nancy Dupláa, Agustina Cherri, Marcela Kloosterboer, Nahuel Mutti, Juan Ponce de León, among others, the youth series Verano del '98. Then he acted in the units  Vulnerables and Culpables in 2002 he returned to work with Cris Morena in the first season of  Rebelde Way. In 2003 he starred with Gabriel Goity the miniseries Femenino masculino. He continued to participate in the fictions Ambiciones, Botines, Mujeres asesinas , Conflictos en red, Algo habrán hecho por la historia argentina, Socias and Para vestir santos. Between 2012 and 2013 he was one of the protagonists of the Pol-ka unit Tiempos compulsivos. In theater he acted in the works De rigurosa etiqueta, Tres versiones de la vida, La forma de las cosas, Un Dios salvaje, Los hijos se han dormido y El hijo de puta del sombrero. In cinema he acted in Claim, Un día de suerte, La ronda, Horizontal/Vertical, Desbordar, Juan y Eva, Verdades verdaderas, Una cita, una fiesta y un gato negro, The German Friend and Días de vinilo. 
From 2014-2015, he joined the cast of Underground Producciones for Telefe, Viudas e hijos del Rock & Roll, starring Damian de Santo and Paola Barrientos. Since 2019, he has been part of the cast of the vintage soap opera Argentina, tierra de amor y venganza for Canal 13.

Theater

Movies

Television

References

External links
 
 

1969 births
Argentine male film actors
Living people
People from Buenos Aires